American Treasures is a reality television show on Discovery Channel. The series premiered on February 22, 2011 and features archaeology professors Dr. Jason De León and Dr. Kirk French, who often receive inquiries from everyday Americans who think they possess items that may have historical significance.

Cast
 Dr. Jason De León, professor at the University of Michigan
 Dr. Kirk French, professor at Penn State University

Episodes

See also
 American Pickers
 Pawn Stars

References

External links
  (via archive.org)
 

2011 American television series debuts
2010s American reality television series
Public archaeology
Discovery Channel original programming
2012 American television series endings